Ipomoea abrupta is a species of plant in the family Convolvulaceae of the genus Ipomoea. It is endemic to Western Australia.

Description
It is a perennial, herbaceous liana with a stem diameter of 2 cm.

References

abrupta
Eudicots of Western Australia
Solanales of Australia
Endemic flora of Western Australia